Patrick S. Boyd (born January 28, 1981) is an educator and American politician who is a member of the Connecticut House of Representatives, serving since 2017. He represents the Towns of Ashford, Brooklyn, Eastford, Hampton, Mansfield, Pomfret, and Woodstock composing the Connecticut's 50th House of Representatives district of the Connecticut General Assembly. Boyd is currently the House Chairman of the Public Safety & Security Committee.

Early life and education
Born in Norwich, Boyd is a Plainfield, Connecticut native, raised in Moosup where he attended local public schools and graduated from Plainfield High School in 1999. He earned a bachelor's degree in history & social science from Eastern Connecticut State University and later earned a master's degree from Sacred Heart University where he was admitted to the Pi Lambda Theta. As a youth, Boyd earned the rank of Eagle Scout and was active in Scouting's National Honor Society, the Order of the Arrow where he was recognized with the Vigil Honor and the Distinguished Service Award.

Professional career
Boyd's career in education began at the Sterling Memorial School in Oneco. In 2003, he joined the faculty of the Rectory School in Pomfret, teaching history, English, leadership and outdoor education. In 2006, he was appointed to the faculty of the Pomfret School, an independent, coeducational, college preparatory boarding school in Pomfret, where he currently serves as the associate dean of students and as a history/government teacher. Boyd serves as the summer camp director of the Boy Scouts of America's June Norcross Webster Scout Reservation in Ashford.

Public service career
He began his public service career serving on the Charter Revision Commission in Plainfield while a student at Eastern Connecticut State University. After moving to Pomfret, he joined the Pomfret Volunteer Fire Department, later serving as the fire company president. He was elected by town meeting to the fire district board and appointed by the board of selectmen to serve as the deputy emergency management director for the town. In February 2016 he announced that he was seeking the Democratic nomination for an open house seat in the Connecticut General Assembly. He was elected on November 8, 2016, with 55% of the vote, and took office on January 4, 2017. Boyd is a founding member of Unite America.

Electoral history

Legislative record
Speaker of the House Joe Aresimowicz appointed Boyd to serve on the Veterans' Affairs Committee, Public Safety and Security Committee for the 2017–2019 session. Boyd is considered a member of the Centrist Wing of the House Democratic Caucus and campaigned openly as an Independent Democrat. Early in the 2017 legislative session, Boyd was the only Democrat in the state house and senate to vote with the Republicans against a deal that Governor Dannel Malloy struck with state employee unions to refinance pension costs.

References

External links
Legislative Website
Ballotpedia

Democratic Party members of the Connecticut House of Representatives
Living people
21st-century American politicians
People from Pomfret, Connecticut
People from Plainfield, Connecticut
1981 births